Caspase 5 is an enzyme that proteolytically cleaves other proteins at an aspartic acid residue, and belongs to a family of cysteine proteases called caspases. It is an inflammatory caspase, along with caspase 1, caspase 4 and the murine caspase 4 homolog caspase 11, and has a role in the immune system.

See also
 The Proteolysis Map
 Caspase

References

External links
 The MEROPS online database for peptidases and their inhibitors: C14.008

EC 3.4.22
Caspases